The Diocese of Orte (Latin: Dioecesis Hortanus) was a Roman Catholic diocese located in the town of Orte in the province of Viterbo in the Italian region of Latium. In 1437, it was suppressed and united with the Diocese of Civita Castellana to form the Diocese of Civita Castellana e Orte.

Ordinaries
Giovanni Cappucci, O.P. (1366 Appointed – 1393 Died)
Paolo Alberti, O.F.M. (12 Nov 1395 Appointed – 13 May 1420 Appointed, Bishop of Ajaccio)
Sante (22 Apr 1420 Appointed – 19 Mar 1431 Appointed, Bishop of Ciudad Rodrigo)
Valentin Narnia (19 Mar 1432 Appointed – 5 Oct 1437 Appointed, Bishop of Civita Castellana e Orte)

References

Former Roman Catholic dioceses in Italy